The Australian Top 100 Singles Chart is a chart that ranks the best-performing singles of Australia. Published by the ARIA report, the data are compiled by the Australian Recording Industry Association (ARIA) based collectively on each single's weekly physical and digital sales and airplay. In 2002, there were 18 singles that topped the chart.

In 2002, 12 acts achieved their first number-one single in Australia, either as a lead artist or featured guest, including Shakira, Eminem, DJ Ötzi, Avril Lavigne, Nelly, Kelly Rowland, Las Ketchup and more have earned a number-one debut single this year. Rapper Eminem and Latino singer Shakira had two number-one singles that appeared in the 2002 issues. During the year, two collaboration singles reached the number-one position.

Shakira's "Whenever, Wherever" and Avril Lavigne's "Complicated" are the longest-running number-one singles of 2002, remaining in that position for six straight weeks. It is followed by Eminems' "Without Me", whose streak on the top spot reached five non-consecutive weeks. Another single with an extended chart run includes Nelly's and Rowland's "Dilemma", which topped the chart for four weeks.

Eminem is the most successful act in 2002 in terms of chart performance. He had two singles that topped the Australian Top 100 Singles Chart: "Without Me" and "Lose Yourself". The only other artist to have two number one singles in 2002 is Shakira.

Chart history 

Songs that peaked at number 2 include "Superman (It's Not Easy)" by Five for Fighting,  "Girlfriend" by *NSYNC feat. Nelly and "Dance with Me"  by 112

Songs that peaked at number 3 include "Murder on the Dancefloor" by Sophie Ellis-Bextor, "Hot in Herre" by Nelly,  "If Tomorrow Never Comes" by Ronan Keating, "U Got It Bad" by Usher,

Other hit songs included  "Tribute" by Tenacious D (4), "Get Over You" by Sophie Ellis-Bextor (4), "Heaven" by DJ Sammy, "Better Man" by Robbie Williams (6), and "Livin' It Up" (6)

See also
 List of number-one dance singles of 2002 (Australia)
 List of number-one albums of 2002 (Australia)

Notes
Number of number-one singles: 18
Longest run at number one: "Whenever, Wherever" by Shakira and "Complicated" by Avril Lavigne (6 weeks).

References
Australian Record Industry Association (ARIA) official site
OzNet Music Chart

2002 in Australian music
2002 record charts
2002